Timothy Murphy may refer to:

Politics
 Tim Murphy (American politician) (born 1952), American Republican Party politician from Pennsylvania
 Tim Murphy (Canadian politician) (born 1959), Canadian politician
 Timothy J. Murphy (1893–1949), Irish Labour Party politician

Sports
 Tim Murphy (Australian footballer) (1878–1902), Australian rules footballer
 Tim Murphy (American football coach) (born 1956), American football coach
 Tim Murphy (hurler) (born 1952), retired Irish hurling manager and former player

Other
 Timothy Murphy (sniper) (1751–1818), sniper in the American Revolutionary War
 Timothy L. Murphy (1816–1897), president of Santa Clara University
 Timothy D. Murphy (died 1928), aka Big Tim, Chicago mobster and labor racketeer
 Timothy Murphy (poet) (1951–2018), American poet, farmer, and businessman
 Timothy P. Murphy, American law enforcement officer and FBI deputy director (2010–11)
 Timothy Patrick Murphy (1959–1988), American film and television actor
 Timothy V. Murphy (born 1960), Irish-born film and television actor
 Tim Murphy (Jurassic Park character), fictional character, in the Jurassic Park franchise
 Tim Murphy, publisher of National Mortgage News